King Saud Medical City (KSMC), also known as Shemaisi Hospital, is a large public district general hospital and Level 1 Trauma Center in Riyadh, Saudi Arabia. It was founded in 1956 and is one of the largest tertiary care centers in Saudi Arabia, with a total bed capacity of 1,500 including 200 ICU beds. The 102-bed emergency department is the busiest in the country, and the hospital serves as the largest referral center in Saudi Arabia for Orthopedic surgery, Trauma surgery and Neurosurgery. It is part of the first healthcare cluster in the city of Riyadh, and currently employs 9,200 healthcare personnel. The hospital has a tremendously high patient turnover, both outpatient and inpatient, and conducted over 20,000 surgical procedures in 2019 alone.

KSMC is also one of the largest medical education, training and research centers in Saudi Arabia, with postgraduate residency and specialist training programs in medicine and surgical subspecialties as well as multiple medical school affiliations.

The medical complex itself houses the General Hospital, as well as the Pediatric Hospital, Maternity Hospital, Dental Center and the King Fahad Charity Kidney Center. KSMC’s core competencies are Emergency Care, Trauma, Orthopedics, Burn Care, Bariatric Surgery, Dental Care and Critical Care.

History 
Founded in 1956, KSMC is the oldest medical city in the Kingdom. It was inaugurated by King Saud bin Abdulaziz as the King Saud Medical Complex, and was at the time a 500-bed facility housing an emergency department and divisions in orthopedics, general surgery, obstetrics and gynecology, pediatrics, and a radiology department, along with a laboratory, pharmacy, and immunization department. The original building remains as the general hospital, and newer buildings include the Medical Towers 1 and 2, the Regional Laboratory, and the Academic Tower.

The first modern intensive care unit in Saudi Arabia was set up in KSMC, and the hospital currently has one of the most highly specialized intensive care units in the region.

KSMC Medical Imaging Department

In 2010, its name was officially changed from King Saud Medical Complex to King Saud Medical City.

In 2020, the hospital launched a digital operating theater incorporating interventional radiology and robotic surgery.

See also 

 List of hospitals in Saudi Arabia
 List of things named after Saudi Kings
 King Faisal Specialist Hospital and Research Centre

References

1956 establishments in Saudi Arabia
Hospital buildings completed in 1956
Hospitals established in 1956
Buildings and structures in Riyadh
Hospitals in Saudi Arabia